Young & Old is the second studio album by American indie pop band Tennis, released in 2012 on Fat Possum Records.

Track listing

Charts

References

2012 albums
Fat Possum Records albums
Tennis (band) albums
Albums produced by Patrick Carney